Idoly Pride (stylized as IDOLY PRIDE) is a Japanese idol-themed multimedia project created by CyberAgent's subsidiary's QualiArts, Straight Edge, and Sony Music Entertainment Japan subsidiary's MusicRay'n, with character designs by QP:flapper.

The series has been adapted into two manga series. An anime television series by CAAnimation and Lerche aired from January to March 2021.

Plot
A small entertainment company, Hoshimi Production, based in Hoshimi City, produced one of the rising stars of the idol industry: Mana Nagase. One day, she died in a road accident on her way to the Venus Grand Prix finals, devastating the people around her, but also inspiring some of them to become idol at the same time.

A few years later, Hoshimi Production holds an audition to find a new idol. Kotono Nagase, the younger sister of Mana, appears on stage along with Sakura Kawasaki, a girl with a voice just like Mana's. Starting with just Kotono and Sakura, and later totaling to a group of ten girls which are divided into two groups: Moon Tempest and Sunny Peace, they all gather and start living together in a dormitory.

The story also features TRINITYAiLE, who want to surpass Mana, in addition to LizNoir, who have an extraordinary rivalry with Mana. Standing up to each other and competing with the pride in their hearts, they aim for their best as the emotions surrounding Mana and the rivalry become entangled.

Characters

Hoshimi Production
 is a small talent agency focused on idols, located in the suburbs of Kanto, headed by Shinji Saegusa.

Mana was a high school student who instantly became popular the moment she debuted as a solo idol. She personally asked her high school classmate, Kōhei Makino, to be her manager at Hoshimi Production because he sat next to her. She was to appear in the Venus Grand Prix finals, only to be killed in a traffic accident while on her way there. She later appears in front of Kōhei as a ghost. It is implied that she had feelings for Kōhei, which are confirmed in the last episode as she kisses him before she return to afterlife. 

Mana's classmate at high school and later manager at Hoshimi Production. A kind of person who cannot say "no" when asked, he is looking after the girls at Hoshimi Production, along with Mana's spirit, whom he can see. Kōhei also serves as the protagonist in the game version, albeit unnamed and is simply referred as "Manager." It is implied that he had feelings for Mana.

 
Hoshimi Production's President. He used to work for a Van Production, a bigger entertainment company, but decided to quit as he desires to have his own company. He was the one who first scouted Mana, and later employed Kōhei as her manager at her request.

Idols
Together, they are collectively referred to as Hoshimi Production.

Kotono is Mana's younger sister who decided to become an idol to live her sister's dream. A stoic and serious person, she serves as leader of the group Moon Tempest. Kotono was initially against the idea of Mana becoming an idol, as the two had much less time together once Mana started her career. Kotono is a sophomore at Hoshimi Private High School.

A bright girl who decided to take Hoshimi Production's audition because "Her heart guides me." Serving as leader of the group Sunny Peace, Sakura's singing voice is said to be similar to Mana's, even surprising Mana herself. It is revealed that Sakura had a heart condition, and that Mana had donated her heart to her. Sakura is a sophomore at Mitsugasaki Public High School. Later in the series, Sakura decides to sing with her own voice, which eventually leads Mana to pass on.

A third year at Reiba Girls' Private High School who is good at dancing, even winning a place in a Japanese dance championship. Raised in a strict family, her parents do not want her to be a dancer. She is a member of Sunny Peace.

A sophomore at Hoshimi Private High School and Kotono's classmate, who decided to become an idol because "Kotono seems to have fun talking about it." She is a member of Moon Tempest.

The oldest of the group at 20 years old, Haruko already had a solo idol career even before Mana. She graduated from Hoshimi Private High School and is currently attending Seiyō Gakuen Private University. She is a member of Sunny Peace. She initially lied about her age to the other members of Hoshimi Production because she was conscious of being older than the others.

Saki is a third year at Mitsugasaki Public High School and its student council president; at school, she is considered an honor student. She always admires idols and decided to become one herself. She is the older sister of Chisa Shiraishi. She is a member of Moon Tempest.

The younger sister of Saki Shiraishi, she is a freshman at Mitsugasaki Public High School. She became an idol because she wants to be together with her sister. However, upon being separated from Saki and becoming a member of Sunny Peace, she begins learning to stop relying too much on her sister.

A third year at Reiba Girls' Private Middle School who greatly admires Mana, referring to her as "Mana-sama". Suzu comes from a wealthy family, a fact she often brings up during her introductions, and came to Hoshimi Production to escape from a certain trouble. She is a member of Moon Tempest.

A freshman at Hoshimi Private High School, Mei is a girl who is personally scouted by Kōhei to change the tension between the members. She has an athletic personality. She is currently the only person besides Kōhei who can see Mana. She is a member of Moon Tempest.

An idol otaku, Shizuku is a freshman at Mitsugasaki Public High School. She is generally quiet and prefers to keep her mouth shut, but starts to talk much whenever there is a talk about idols. She is a member of Sunny Peace.

Van Production
The entertainment company with a particular specialty in idols, and Saegusa's former employers.

 (anime)
Van Production's President. Although calm and emotionless, he always has the back of the idol groups he created. He is Rui's biological factor, although he is unaware of this.

 (anime)
LizNoir's manager in Van Production.

TRINITYAiLE
The voice actresses of TRINITYAiLE are the members of group unit TrySail.

TRINITYAiLE's center. It is revealed that Asakura is her biological father, though Asakura himself seems to be unaware of this fact.

A bright girl who speaks in a Kyoto dialect.

A former child actress who turned into an idol.

LizNoir
The voice actresses of LizNoir are the members of group unit Sphere. In the anime, only Rio and Aoi appear as members of the group at first, while Ai and Kokoro join the group in the last episode.

Media

Manga
A manga series by Hiroki Haruse, titled IDOLY PRIDE Stage of Asterism, began serialization on Kadokawa's Comic Newtype website on June 10, 2020. 

A second manga series by Yuriko Asami, titled IDOLY PRIDE Beginning of Lodestar, began serialization through the ComicWalker and Niconico Seiga websites on October 30, 2020. The series focuses on Mana Nagase and serves as a prequel to the main series.

Volume list

IDOLY PRIDE Stage of Asterism

IDOLY PRIDE Beginning of Lodestar

Anime
An anime television series was first announced in December 2019. It is the first anime produced by CAAnimation, a label created by CyberAgent to produce original anime. Lerche is also credited for production. The series was directed by Yū Kinome and written by Tatsuya Takahashi, with character designs by Sumie Kinoshita. It aired from January 10 to March 28, 2021 on Tokyo MX and other channels. The opening theme song is "IDOLY PRIDE", while the ending theme song is "The Sun, Moon and Stars", both performed by Hoshimi Production. Funimation licensed the series and streamed it on its website in North America, Britain and Ireland, in mainland Europe through Wakanim, and in Australia and New Zealand through AnimeLab.

Game
A mobile game for Android and iOS developed by Cygames and QualiArts was released on June 24, 2021.

A year after its initial Japanese release, an English version was later stealthily revealed to be published by Boltrend Games. It had a closed beta test on September 14, 2022, with the end date previously being September 21, before being extended for two days. After said beta, Boltrend Games would start pre-registrations with an official release date to be announced.

Notes

References

External links
  
  
  

2021 anime television series debuts
2021 video games
Crunchyroll anime
Cygames franchises
Japanese idols in anime and manga
Japanese webcomics
Kadokawa Dwango franchises
Kadokawa Shoten manga
Lerche (studio)
Mass media franchises
Shōnen manga
Tokyo MX original programming